Brandon is an unincorporated village and census-designated place (CDP) in the town of Brandon, Rutland County, Vermont, United States. As of the 2020 census, the population was 1,727.

Most of the village is listed on the National Register of Historic Places as the Brandon Village Historic District.

History
In 1976, approximately  along U.S. Route 7 in Brandon and its vicinity were listed as a historic district on the National Register of Historic Places. The district includes nearly 250 buildings significant for their history and their architecture.

Geography
Brandon is located at  (43.798056, 73.086389).

According to the United States Census Bureau, the CDP has a total area of 7.4 km2 (2.8 mi2), all land.

Demographics
As of the census of 2000, there were 1,684 people, 718 households, and 463 families residing in the CDP.  The population density was 228.1/km2 (591.7/mi2).  There were 781 housing units at an average density of 105.8/km2 (274.4/mi2).  The racial makeup of the CDP was 98.46% White, 0.06% Black or African American, 0.24% Native American, 0.12% Asian, and 1.13% from two or more races. Hispanic or Latino of any race were 0.18% of the population.

There were 718 households, out of which 28.8% had children under the age of 18 living with them, 49.9% were married couples living together, 12.4% had a female householder with no husband present, and 35.5% were non-families. 29.7% of all households were made up of individuals, and 15.5% had someone living alone who was 65 years of age or older.  The average household size was 2.35 and the average family size was 2.86.

In the CDP, the population was spread out, with 23.8% under the age of 18, 5.6% from 18 to 24, 27.6% from 25 to 44, 27.1% from 45 to 64, and 16.0% who were 65 years of age or older.  The median age was 41 years. For every 100 females, there were 83.6 males.  For every 100 females age 18 and over, there were 82.0 males.

The median income for a household in the CDP was $34,609, and the median income for a family was $44,514. Males had a median income of $28,382 versus $22,159 for females. The per capita income for the CDP was $23,705.  About 6.8% of families and 12.4% of the population were below the poverty line, including 15.7% of those under age 18 and 17.0% of those age 65 or over.

Notable person

 Stephen A. Douglas, U.S. Senator from Illinois

References

CDP
Census-designated places in Vermont
Census-designated places in Rutland County, Vermont
National Register of Historic Places in Rutland County, Vermont

ca:Brandon (Vermont)
vo:Brandon (Vermont)